Sabanagrande is a corregimiento in Pesé District, Herrera Province, Panama with a population of 1,591 as of 2010. Its population as of 1990 was 1,692; its population as of 2000 was 1,698.

References

Corregimientos of Herrera Province